The 2018–19 SEC women's basketball season began with practices in October 2018, followed by the start of the 2018–19 NCAA Division I women's basketball season in November. Conference play started in early January 2019 and concluded in February, followed by the 2019 SEC women's basketball tournament at the Bon Secours Wellness Arena in Greenville, South Carolina, in March.

Pre-season

Pre-season team predictions

Pre-season All-SEC teams

Coaches select eight players
Players in bold are choices for SEC Player of the Year

Head coaches

Note: Stats shown are before the beginning of the season. Overall and SEC records are from time at current school.

Weekly rankings

Regular season matrix

Postseason

SEC tournament

 March 6–10 at the Bon Secours Wellness Arena in Greenville, South Carolina. Teams were seeded by conference record, with ties broken by record between the tied teams followed by record against the regular-season champion.

NCAA Division I Women's Basketball tournament

Women's National Invitation tournament

WNBA Draft

References

 
Southeastern Conference women's basketball seasons